Eine wie keine  (One of A Kind) is a German television series.

See also
List of German television series

External links
 

German telenovelas
2009 German television series debuts
2010 German television series endings
German-language television shows
Sat.1 telenovelas